Cronin is an unincorporated community in Anderson County, located in the U.S. state of Texas. Cronin is 290 feet above sea level. It is a part of the Palestine, Texas micropolitan area.

References

Unincorporated communities in Anderson County, Texas
Unincorporated communities in Texas